Perunna Subrahmanya Swami temple is a Hindu temple located in Changanacherry. The deity of the temple is Murugan one of the three sons of Lord Shiva. This is the first temple in Kerala which was opened to all Hindus (irrespective of the caste), as per the order of Chithira Thirunal Balarama Varma of Travancore kingdom. Hearing this incident Mohandas Gandhi during his first visit to Kerala came to the temple and worshipped the Muruga for days. A grand ceremony and meeting were conducted at the east gate of the temple then.

Deity
In the temple, the furious form of Murugan is worshipped. The Vel is pointed downwards. Murugan is worshipped here in the form of Devasenapathi, the supreme general of the holy forces. The deity is in an angry and furious mood as he had just killed Tharakasuran. He is in a very angry mood as he had just killed Tharakasuran. He faces east as seen in most of the temples, and this is the only temple with a furious form. Mahaganapathi, Krishna, Shiva and serpent deities are the other deities.

Perunna inscriptions
Inscriptions in Vatteshuthu alphabet can be seen at the west gate of the temple. These are believed to be written in the 10th century, during the rule of Kulasekhara Koyiladhikari.
Perunna is a holy place with a lot of temples. the deity inside the temple is in a furious mood 
because he came here after killing the asura (demon). Sarppa deva , rakshas ayyappa mahaganapathi, krishna, shiva are other deities in this temple.a lot of people came here and pray to lord muruga. Tuesday is an important day in this temple. the pooja are done by brahmin specialists. December - January are time of festival in this temple. he is known as the ruler or king of perunna kingdom.

See also
 Temples of Kerala

External links
 Perunna Murugan Temple website

Hindu temples in Kottayam district
Murugan temples in Kerala
Changanassery